Jasper Lawrence (born 1964) is a British citizen and advocate of helminthic therapy.

After losing medical coverage and having a severe case of asthma, he travelled from Santa Cruz, California to Cameroon, and intentionally infected himself with hookworm.

When it worked, Lawrence became an advocate for helminthic therapy. He returned to the United States and founded an internet company selling hookworm kits. He came to the attention of the FDA through an ABC story, who accused him of selling pharmaceuticals without a license,  and fled the United States.

References

External links
 Jasper Lawrence and helminthic therapy
Aeon article by William Parker
Helminthic Therapy Wiki: Helminth Providers
Radio Lab on NPR
The Radio Lab update
Straightdope.com
Scienceline.org
Abc.net.au

1964 births
Living people
Nematodes and humans
People in alternative medicine
Helminthology